Dade City station is a railroad station and historic site located in Dade City, Florida, United States. 
The station is located on CSX's S-Line, which runs along the east side of the building. On July 15, 1994, it was added to the U.S. National Register of Historic Places.

History
Built in 1912 by the Atlantic Coast Line Railroad (now CSX Transportation), it is located on the U.S. 98/301 Bypass, across the street from East Meridian Avenue (SR 52). Until 1957 it served as a station on their High Springs—Lakeland Line from Trilby to Tampa, serving the ACL's Southland en route to Tampa.

In 1971, most passenger service in the United States was transferred to Amtrak, but Dade City still remained without passenger service. Throughout the latter part of the 20th century, Amtrak would move trains off and onto the S-Line. Some of these trains include the Silver Meteor, Silver Star, Floridian, and Palmetto. However, Dade City still remained without service. Finally, in 1990, Amtrak brought passenger service back to Dade City by rerouting the Silver Star over the S-Line through Ocala and Wildwood, FL to Miami. Amtrak later rerouted the Silver Star again to the CSX A-Line through Orlando in 1996, and instead revived the Silver Palm along the S-Line, where it would keep its name, sleepers, and diner until 2002. In 2002, the train would be renamed back to Palmetto. Two years later, the Palmetto was truncated to Savannah, Georgia on November 1, 2004, prompting Amtrak to revive Silver Star service to Tampa along the CSX A-Line shared by the current Silver Meteor, and part of the suspended Sunset Limited, and ending passenger service to Dade City once again. Today, the station operates as a museum, and Amtrak's Thruway Motorcoach bus service between Jacksonville and Lakeland still uses the station building.

Preservation 
The station was preserved and reopened as a tourist destination with a grand re-opening held on October 23, 2008. Through efforts from the city and local residents, the depot was transformed into the Dade City Heritage and Cultural Museum in 2018, where it now houses artifacts, photographs, documents, and records of historic places and longtime residents of Dade City. The museum consists of a main exhibition space, a model train room, and a Community Archive and Reading Room, where residents can conduct research on Dade City's people and history. The museum is a registered 501(c)3 non-profit and maintains close ties to the city of Dade City.

Gallery

References

External links

 Pasco County listings at National Register of Historic Places
 Florida's Office of Cultural and Historical Programs
 Pasco County listings
 Amtrak Station

Amtrak Thruway Motorcoach stations in Florida
Former Atlantic Coast Line Railroad stations
Former Amtrak stations in Florida
Former railway stations in Florida
Museums in Pasco County, Florida
Railway stations on the National Register of Historic Places in Florida
Railroad museums in Florida
Vernacular architecture in Florida
Railway stations in the United States opened in 1912
Dade City, Florida
1912 establishments in Florida
National Register of Historic Places in Pasco County, Florida
Transportation buildings and structures in Pasco County, Florida
Railway stations closed in 2004
Repurposed railway stations in the United States